Literary theorists have identified  visual poetry as a development of concrete poetry but with the characteristics of intermedia in which non-representational language and visual elements predominate.

Differentiation from concrete poetry
As the literary and artistic experiments of the 1950s that were at first loosely grouped together as concrete poetry extended further into the ambiguous sphere which Dick Higgins described in 1965 as 'Intermedia', it became apparent that such creations were further and further divorced from the representational language with which poetry had hitherto been associated and that they needed to be categorised as a separate phenomenon.

In her survey, Concrete Poetry: A World View (1968), Mary Ellen Solt, observed that certain trends included under the label Concrete Poetry were tending towards a “New Visual Poetry”. Its chief characteristic is that it leaves behind the old poetic function of orality and is therefore distinct from the ancient tradition of shaped poetry from which Concrete Poetry claimed to have derived. Visual poetry, on the other hand, is to be distinguished by its deployment of typography.
 
Solt included in her proposed new genre the work of Ian Hamilton Finlay, John Furnival and Hansjörg Mayer. Her definition was extended by Marvin A Sackner in his introduction to the Ohio State University 2008 collection of Visual Poetry: "I define concrete poems as those in which only letters and/or words are utilized to form a visual image, whereas visual poems constitute those in which images are integrated into the text of the poem". He also separated out artist-generated picture poems and artists' books as an allied category, citing the work of Kenneth Patchen.  Also to be found in the university collection is Tom Phillips' A Humument, as well as an assortment of handwritten but non-linguistic texts.

In the light of these assertions, a new genealogy of forerunners to Visual Poetry emerges that includes Joan Miró's poem-painting Le corps de ma brune (1925), Piet Mondrian's incorporation of Michel Seuphor's text in Textuel (1928), and prints by H.N. Werkman using elements of typography. The last also used the typewriter to create abstract patterns (which he called ), using not just letters but also purely linear elements. Created during the 1920s, they anticipated the intermediary 'typestracts' of the Concrete poet Dom Sylvester Houédard during the 1960s that would equally qualify as Visual Poetry.

Klaus Peter Dencker also stresses the continuity to the new genre in his theoretical paper "From Concrete to Visual Poetry" (2000), pointing out its "intermedial and interdisciplinary" nature. The two are also interdependent and "without concrete poetry the current forms of visual poetry would be unthinkable". However, the academic Willard Bohn prefers to categorise the whole gamut of literary and artistic experiment in this area since the late 19th century under the label of Visual Poetry and has done so in a number of books since 1986. From his reductionist point of view, "Visual poetry can be defined as poetry that is meant to be seen – poetry that presupposes a viewer as well as a reader".

See also
Asemic writing
Digital poetry
Haptic poetry
List of concrete and visual poets
Something Else Press
Video poetry
Concrete poetry

References

Bibliography
Bohn, Willard: The Aesthetics of Visual Poetry, 1914-1928,  University Of Chicago Press, 1986
Bohn, Willard: Modern Visual Poetry, Associated University Presses 2001 
Bohn, Willard: Reading Visual Poetry, Fairleigh Dickinson University, 2010 
Dencker,  Klaus Peter: "From Concrete to Visual Poetry", Kaldron On-Line and Light and Dust Mobile Anthology of Poetry, 2000
Higgins, Dick:  "Synesthesia and Intersenses: Intermedia" 1965/1981. Also published as a chapter in his Horizons, the Poetics and Theory of the Intermedia (Southern Illinois University, 1984).
Hill, Crag & Vassilakis, Nico (editors) The Last Vispo Anthology: Visual Poetry 1998-2008 Fantagraphics, 2012. 
Solt, Mary Ellen: Concrete Poetry: A World View, Indiana University 1968

External links
UbuWeb, which hosts a large amount of concrete poetry
The Sackner Archive of Concrete and Visual Poetry
thing.net

Genres of poetry